Lothkunta is a suburb in the  Secunderabad Cantonment on the northern border of Hyderabad city, Telangana, India. 

It is situated at a distance of around 7 km from Secunderabad and approximately 14 km from Hyderabad. It lies on the national highway 7.

Economy
Lothkunta is located in the commercial district within the cantonment area where restaurants, theatres, and other establishments can be found. This place is connected to Bollaram and Rashtrapati Nilayam.

Transport
Lothkunta is 7 km away from Secunderabad Railway station, 12 km away from the Old Hyderabad Airport in Begumpet Begumpet Airport, and about 40 km from New International Airport in Shamshabad Rajiv Gandhi International Airport.

TSRTC runs buses here connecting Lothkunta to all parts of the city.

References

Neighbourhoods in Hyderabad, India
Geography of Hyderabad, India